Parliamentary elections were held in Brazil on 15 November 1974. The National Renewal Alliance won 203 of the 364 seats in the Chamber of Deputies, whilst the Brazilian Democratic Movement won 16 of the 22 seats in the Senate. Voter turnout was 80.9%.

Results

Chamber of Deputies

Senate

References

General elections in Brazil
Brazil
Legislative
Brazil